The anterior perforated substance is a part of the brain. It is bilateral. It is irregular and quadrilateral. It lies in front of the optic tract and behind the olfactory trigone.

Structure 
The anterior perforated substance is bilateral. It lies in front of the optic tract. It lies behind the olfactory trigone, separated by the fissure prima. Medially and in front, it is continuous with the subcallosal gyrus. Laterally, it is bounded by the lateral stria of the olfactory tract, and is continued into the uncus.

Its gray substance is confluent above with that of the corpus striatum, and is perforated anteriorly by numerous small blood vessels that supply such areas as the internal capsule.

The anterior cerebral artery arises just below the anterior perforated substance. The middle cerebral artery passes through its lateral two thirds.

Blood supply 
The anterior perforated substance is supplied by lenticulostriate arteries, which branch from the middle cerebral artery. It is also supplied by anterior choroidal artery. Small branches from these create holes, which give the anterior perforated substance its name.

History 
The anterior perforated substance is named after the holes created by small blood vessels that supply it.

Additional images

See also 
 Posterior perforated substance

References

External links 
  - "Interpeduncular fossa" (#6)
 Photo at umdnj.edu
 NIF Search - Anterior perforated substance via the Neuroscience Information Framework

Rostral basal ganglia and associated structures